Rockford is an unincorporated community in Gage County, Nebraska, United States.

History
Rockford was founded in 1858.

References

Unincorporated communities in Gage County, Nebraska
Unincorporated communities in Nebraska